Williamson River may refer to:
 Williamson River (Oregon)
 Williamson River (New Zealand)